Beatrice Balana Bofia (born November 9, 1984) is a Cameroonian American collegiate basketball player, currently playing for the University of Arizona The Arizona Wildcats. She was born in Bafia, Cameroon, and is the older twin sister of Suzy Bofia. At 6 feet 7½ inches tall, Bofia is usually positioned as a center because of her great height.

Early life
Bofia began playing basketball at 13 years old. Her younger sister, Suzy, began shortly  afterwards. Her career led her to play at Technical High School for two years in Cameroon.

University of Arizona
Later she attended Illinois Central College in America.

Freshman (2004-05)
A junior college transfer from Illinois Central, Bofia was recruited by former Arizona coach Joan Bonvicini along with sister Suzy. She appeared in 29 games for the Wildcats during her first season.

Sophomore (2005-06)
under head coach Steve Garber, she averaged 4.4 points and 3.5 rebounds for the Cougars.

Redshirted (2006-07)
In early November 2006, Beatrice suffered a minor knee injury that kept her off the court for several weeks. She was  redshirted and sat out the entire 2006-07 season. She came back last season to average three points and three rebounds per game.

Junior (2007-08)
Appeared in 29 games for the Wildcats during her first season with the team.

Tallest Female Twins
Beatrice and Suzy are considered to be the tallest female twins in the world. However, Guinness World Records list volleyball players Ann Recht and Claire Recht as the tallest. This record is no longer disputed since the Recht sisters were measured again when they were 18 in 2006 and are both at least 6'7".   This record has yet to be challenged by the Bofia sisters since 2006.

See also
Suzy Bofia
Human height
Growth hormone
Height discrimination

References

External links
Arizona Wildcats Profile

1984 births
Living people
Cameroonian women's basketball players
Arizona Wildcats women's basketball players
Centers (basketball)
Cameroonian expatriate basketball people in the United States
Cameroonian twins
Twin sportspeople
Illinois Central Cougars women's basketball players